Drawbridge (formerly Saline City) is a ghost town with an abandoned railroad station located at the southern end of the San Francisco Bay, next to Station Island, now a part of the city of Fremont, California, United States. Formerly used as a hunting village, it has been a ghost town since 1979 and is slowly sinking into the marshlands. It is now part of the Don Edwards San Francisco Bay National Wildlife Refuge and is illegal to visit.

History

Drawbridge was created by the narrow-gauge South Pacific Coast Railroad on Station Island in 1876 and consisted of one small cabin for the operator of the railroad's two drawbridges crossing Mud Slough and Coyote Creek to connect Newark with Alviso and San Jose. At one time 10 passenger trains stopped there per day, five going north and five going south. The drawbridges were removed long ago. The only path leading into Drawbridge is the Union Pacific Railroad track.

In the 1880s, on weekends nearly 1,000 visitors flocked to the town. By the 1920s, although the town had no roads, it did have 90 buildings, and was divided into two neighborhoods: the predominantly Roman Catholic South Drawbridge, and the predominantly Protestant North Drawbridge.

After the drawbridges were removed and most of the residents had left, the San Jose Mercury News for years incorrectly reported that the town was a ghost town and that the residents left valuables behind. As a result, the people still living there had their homes vandalized. The town's last resident is said to have left in 1979, and Drawbridge is considered to be the San Francisco Bay Area's only ghost town. Drawbridge is now part of the Don Edwards San Francisco Bay National Wildlife Refuge and is no longer open to the public due to restoration efforts, though it can still briefly be viewed from Altamont Corridor Express, Capitol Corridor, and Coast Starlight trains.

See also

Lexington, California
Patchen, California
Wingo, California

References

Further reading
Video and Images of Drawbridge 2014 and 2016

External links

San Francisco Bay Wildlife Society
Drawbridge, California - A Hand-Me-Down History

Neighborhoods in Fremont, California
Railway stations in Alameda County, California
Populated places established in 1876
Ghost towns in the San Francisco Bay Area
Railroad bridges in California
Former settlements in Alameda County, California
Former Southern Pacific Railroad stations in California
1876 establishments in California
Islands of Alameda County, California
Islands of Northern California
Islands of San Francisco Bay